Bryson is a city in Jack County, Texas, United States. As of the 2010 census, its population was 539.

Geography

Bryson is located in western Jack County at  (33.160523, –98.387805). US 380 continues southwest  to Graham, the county seat of Young County.

Bryson is in the Rock Creek watershed, flowing south to the Brazos River.

History
The community was first settled in the late 19th century. Originally known as "Mount Hecla", a post office opened under that name in 1878. Henry Bryson built the area's first residence, a log cabin, that same year. The community was later renamed after him. This change was officially recognized in 1884, when the local post office took the name "Bryson". Mr. Bryson went on to serve as County Commissioner. Early pioneer family names of Bryson were Blount, Chambers, Clayton, Cook, Crumpton, Cullers, Enlow, Epperson, Henderson, Keyser, Kuykendall, McCloud, Moore, Raley, Shanafelt and Vanhooser.

The Chicago, Rock Island and Texas Railway, a subsidiary of the Chicago, Rock Island and Pacific Railroad, reached Bryson in the fall of 1902. Although oil had been discovered in Jack County as early as 1898, it wasn't until the mid-1920s that Bryson became an oil processing center for local producers. The resulting population boom led to the community being known as Jack County's "second city" (after Jacksboro).

On June 6, 1929, the town incorporated a mayor-council form of government. Men who served there include B.B. Bryson, Sam Cullers, L.O. Moore, J.R. Clayton, Willis Williams, and Williard Schlitter. The town had a population of 641 in the 1930 census. A 1938 oil boom in Bryson hepled the population explode, with many people forced to live in tents. In 1940, the census dropped back to 806. As oil production declined, so did the population. The low point occurred in 1970, when only 455 people lived within the city limits. During the latter half of the 20th century, Bryson slowly grew to over 500 residents. In 1988,  seven businesses were serving the community. Reportedly, 22 businesses were in Bryson as of 2004.

Demographics

2020 census

As of the 2020 United States census, there were 430 people, 278 households, and 197 families residing in the city.

2000 census
As of the census of 2000,  528 people, 222 households, and 146 families were residing in the city. The population density was 426.0 people/sq mi (164.4/km2). The 261 housing units averaged 210.6/sq mi (81.3/km2). The racial makeup of the city was 93.75% White, 0.76% African American, 2.27% Native American, 0.38% Asian, 0.19% from other races, and 2.65% from two or more races. Hispanics or Latinos of any race were 1.70% of the population.

There were 222 households, out of which 31.1% had children under the age of 18 living with them, 53.2% were married couples living together, 9.5% had a female householder with no husband present, and 33.8% were non-families. 30.6% of all households were made up of individuals, and 14.9% had someone living alone who was 65 years of age or older. The average household size was 2.38 and the average family size was 2.98.

In the city, the population was spread out, with 26.5% under the age of 18, 7.8% from 18 to 24, 27.1% from 25 to 44, 22.7% from 45 to 64, and 15.9% who were 65 years of age or older. The median age was 38 years. For every 100 females, there were 92.7 males. For every 100 females age 18 and over, there were 86.5 males.

The median income for a household in the city was $26,071, and the median income for a family was $30,588. Males had a median income of $27,083 versus $20,114 for females. The per capita income for the city was $13,264. About 12.3% of families and 17.4% of the population were below the poverty line, including 15.9% of those under age 18 and 26.5% of those age 65 or over.

Education
The city is served by the Bryson Independent School District.

In 1875, the first school was started at a log cabin and was named "Cottonwood". As its population grew, its log cabin school was replaced with a frame building, which was later replaced by a two-story building. In 1885, the school was renamed "Bryson Academy" with two new instructors named J.T. Lippard, and C.B Hickman. In 1905, the two-story frame was turned into a brick structure for elementary and high school. In 1938, the school built a gym. Later, a new high school was built and the old brick building was turned into an AG shop. In 1957, a new elementary school building was built. In 2012, the old school was razed and a new school was raised.

References

External links
 City of Bryson official website
 Handbook of Texas Online: Bryson, Texas
 Bryson Independent School District

Cities in Texas
Cities in Jack County, Texas